Marie-Thérèse Hermange (born 17 September 1947) is a French politician and a member of the Senate of France. She represents Paris and is a member of the Union for a Popular Movement Party. Suspected of treachery in favour of Laboratoires Servier, and tried for bribery in the Mediator affair in April 2013, she has been nonetheless elected a member of the Ethical Commission of the Académie de Médecine (2017) and exonerated for lack of evidence on March 29, 2021.

Notes

References
Page on the Senate website

1947 births
Living people
French Senators of the Fifth Republic
Union for a Popular Movement MEPs
MEPs for France 1999–2004
20th-century women MEPs for France
21st-century women MEPs for France
Women members of the Senate (France)
Senators of Paris